Myra Timena Moller (born 1984) is an elite cyclist born in New Zealand. She competes in both mountain biking and road cycling events. Myra is the niece of Olympic marathon bronze medallist, Lorraine Moller, and the daughter of Teniinii and Gary Moller. Myra discovered Mountain Biking at 13. She entered the World Cup Open (Pro Elite grade) aged 17. She represented New Zealand in the Elite Women's Duathlon World Championships in 2005. In 2006, she competed at the Commonwealth Games, held in Melbourne, Australia. She was the first cyclist to represent the Cook Islands at the Commonwealth Games. In 2008,2009, she competed in the Australian Open Road Championships Road Race.



Palmarès
2002
3rd Chile Classic State Series MTB Race, New Mexico, USA
8th NZMBA National Mountain Biking Series
5th Karapoti Classic 5th

2005
3rd PnP Wellington Track Cycling Series
3rd PnP Wellington Cycling Time Trial Road Championships, New Zealand
3rd 100 km Vaude Highland Fling MTB race, Bundanoon, New South Wales, Australia (representing New Zealand)
3rd Sutherland Criterium, Sydney, Australia (mixed)
2nd NZ Mountain Bike Marathon Championships, Colville Classic
3rd Karapoti Classic Mountain Bike Race, New Zealand
1st New Zealand Mountain Biking National Series, Tokoroa, New Zealand

2006
World Championships, Rotorua, New Zealand
9th Commonwealth Games Individual Women's Mountain Biking (representing Cook Islands), Melbourne, Australia
Oceania Games MTB Championships (representing Cook Islands)
5th Karapoti Classic MTB Race, New Zealand
3rd NZ National MTB Series, Palmerston North
12th NZ National Mountain Bike Championships
2nd Meridian Energy Grand Prix Tour, Wellington, New Zealand

References

External links
Myra Moller Profile

1983 births
New Zealand sportspeople of Cook Island descent
Cook Island female cyclists
New Zealand female cyclists
New Zealand mountain bikers
Commonwealth Games competitors for the Cook Islands
Cyclists at the 2006 Commonwealth Games
Living people